Claysburg is an extinct town in Preble County, in the U.S. state of Ohio.

History
Claysburg was laid out and platted in 1833.

References

Geography of Preble County, Ohio
Ghost towns in Ohio